The 1986–87 Norwegian 1. Divisjon season was the 48th season of ice hockey in Norway. Ten teams participated in the league, and Valerenga Ishockey won the championship.

Regular season

Playoffs

External links 
 Norwegian Ice Hockey Federation

Nor
1986-87
1986 in Norwegian sport
1987 in Norwegian sport